Lebyazhy is a rural locality (a selo) in Zubovsky Selsoviet, Ufimsky District, Bashkortostan, Russia. The population was 290 as of 2010. There are 13 streets.

Geography 
Lebyazhy is located 14 km south of Ufa (the district's administrative centre) by road. Tsvety Bashkirii is the nearest rural locality.

References 

Rural localities in Ufimsky District